2021 Champions League may refer to:

Football
2020–21 UEFA Champions League
2021–22 UEFA Champions League
2021 AFC Champions League
2020–21 CAF Champions League
2021–22 CAF Champions League